

General  Sigfrid Henrici  (10 May 1889 – 8 November 1964) was a German general during  World War II.

During the invasion of Poland in 1939, Henrici was the commander of the 16th Infantry Division (motorised).

He commanded XXXX Panzer Corps from November 1942 to October 1943, when he was severely wounded in Ukraine. He returned to service in 1944 and became again commander of the XXXX Panzerkorps in September, which he led until the end of the war.

He was taken prisoner by the Red Army on 9 May 1945 and was released from Soviet captivity in 1955. He died on 8 November 1964.

Awards
 Iron Cross (1914)  2nd Class (14 September 1914) & 1st Class (24 December 1915)
 Clasp to the Iron Cross (1939)  2nd Class (20 September 1939) & 1st Class (20 May 1940)
 German Cross in Gold on 13 August 1943 as General der Panzertruppe and commanding general of the XXXX. Panzerkorps
 Knight's Cross of the Iron Cross with Oak Leaves
 Knight's Cross on 13 October 1941 as Generalleutnant and commander of the 16. Infanterie-Division (motorized)
 Oak Leaves on 9 December 1943 as General der Panzertruppe and commanding general of the XL. Panzerkorps

References

Citations

Bibliography

 
 
 
 

1889 births
1964 deaths
People from Soest, Germany
People from the Province of Westphalia
Generals of Panzer Troops
Luftstreitkräfte personnel
Recipients of the clasp to the Iron Cross, 1st class
Recipients of the Gold German Cross
Recipients of the Knight's Cross of the Iron Cross with Oak Leaves
German prisoners of war in World War II held by the Soviet Union
Reichswehr personnel
Military personnel from North Rhine-Westphalia
German Army generals of World War II